Don Pritchard (22 December 1922 – 1976) was a Bahamian sailor. He competed in the 5.5 Metre event at the 1952 Summer Olympics.

References

External links
 

1922 births
1976 deaths
Bahamian male sailors (sport)
Olympic sailors of the Bahamas
Sailors at the 1952 Summer Olympics – 5.5 Metre
Sportspeople from Nassau, Bahamas